Madeline Smith (born 2 August 1949) is an English actress. After working as a model in the late 1960s, she went on to appear in many television series and stage productions, plus comedy and horror films, in the 1970s and 1980s.

She is perhaps best known for playing Bond girl Miss Caruso in Live and Let Die (1973), but also had larger roles in the Hammer horror films The Vampire Lovers (1970), Taste the Blood of Dracula (1970), Tam-Lin (1970), Theatre of Blood (1973) and Frankenstein and the Monster from Hell (1974) and comedy films including Up Pompeii (1971), Up the Front (1972) and Carry On Matron (1972) amongst others. She also appeared in the films The Killing of Sister George (1968), Pussycat, Pussycat, I Love You (1970), The Amazing Mr. Blunden (1972)  and the musical film Take Me High (1973) with Cliff Richard.

After leaving the acting profession in the mid 1980s to bring up her family, she returned to acting in 2011.

Early life
Smith was born in Hartfield, Sussex, the only child of Robert and Ursula Smith (née Boas). Her father owned an antiques shop and painting restoration business near Kew Gardens, and her Swiss mother was a translator. After a convent school education, in her late teens she had a temporary job at Biba, the famous boutique located on Kensington High Street, London. It was at the instigation of Barbara Hulanicki, founder of Biba, that she became a model. In the late 1960s and early '70s, she was regularly featured in the work of Disc cartoonist J Edward Oliver, who on one occasion devoted an entire strip to her entitled 'The Life and Habits of the Madeline Smith'.

Career
Smith's first screen role was a small part in the film Escalation (1968) following this with a role in The Mini-Affair (1967), although the latter was released first. Smith first worked for Hammer Film Productions in Taste the Blood of Dracula (1969), billed as 'Maddy Smith' and playing an East End prostitute. Among her other film appearances, she played opposite Ava Gardner in Tam-Lin, Peter Cushing in The Vampire Lovers and Frankenstein and the Monster from Hell, Diana Dors in The Amazing Mr Blunden, Frankie Howerd in Up Pompeii and Up the Front, and Vincent Price in Theatre of Blood. In 1972, Smith appeared in Carry On Matron in a scene alongside Hattie Jacques, Barbara Windsor and Joan Sims. In 1973, she played the Bond girl Miss Caruso, in the post-opening titles sequence of Live and Let Die, the first James Bond film starring Roger Moore. Smith's role is therefore significant as Miss Caruso is the first Bond girl of the Roger Moore era. She was recommended for the role by Moore himself, having previously appeared with him in an episode of The Persuaders! on TV. Smith and Moore take part in a scene in which he unzips her dress with a magnetic watch.

Smith's numerous stage credits include working with US director Charles Marowitz on Blue Comedy (Yvonne Arnaud Theatre, Guildford) and The Snob (at Marowitz's Tottenham Court Road venue the Open Space). She also acted opposite Alec Guinness in the original West End production of Alan Bennett's Habeas Corpus (playing Felicity Rumpers), supported Frankie Howerd again in the Volpone adaptation The Fly and the Fox (Churchill Theatre, Bromley), played Elma in a Cambridge Theatre Company revival of Frederick Lonsdale's Canaries Sometimes Sing, and spent two years playing the female lead in Agatha Christie's The Mousetrap at the St Martin's Theatre.

Her television credits include Doctor at Large (1971), The Two Ronnies (appearing in the serial 'Hampton Wick', 1971), Clochemerle (1972), His and Hers (1970) with Tim Brooke-Taylor, Casanova '73 (1973) with Leslie Phillips, Steptoe and Son (1974), The Howerd Confessions (1976), Why Didn't They Ask Evans? (1980) and The Steam Video Company (1984). She also featured in two episodes of All Creatures Great and Small, as two different characters (as Angela Farmer in "Pride of Possession" (1978) and as Anne Grantley in the 1983 Christmas special). She was a member of the regular cast of the BBC2 series The End of the Pier Show (1974) and In The Looking Glass (1978) alongside satirists John Wells and John Fortune and composer Carl Davis. Smith also starred in The Passionate Pilgrim (1984) which turned out to be the final screen appearance of Eric Morecambe.

After the birth of her daughter in 1984, Smith gradually wound down her career to enable her time to bring her up. In 2009, Smith interviewed in, and was the cover star of, the coffee-table book Hammer Glamour. She returned to acting in 2011 with an appearance in an episode of Doctors. She then followed this with a role in a docu-drama marking the one-hundredth anniversary of the sinking of the Titanic before starring in the mini-series Dancing on the Edge (2013) and appearing in an episode of Not Going Out in 2014. In 2015 she appeared as a contestant on the red team in the BBC antiques gameshow Bargain Hunt. In December 2018 she appeared in episode 4 of the Christmas series of Celebrity Mastermind with The History of Kew Gardens as her specialist subject. In 2019, Smith reunited with her Up Pompeii! co-star Tim Brooke-Taylor and actors including Frazer Hines and Camille Coduri in an recorded audio play of the same name to mark fifty years of the series.

Personal life
Smith married actor David Buck in 1975; he died from cancer in 1989. The couple had a daughter, Emily, born in 1984.

Filmography

Film

Television

Bibliography

References

External links

Madeline Smith Retrospective at Den Of Geek
 BBC: Actress recalls glamour of Hammer – 2009 interview with Madeline Smith

1949 births
Living people
20th-century English actresses
21st-century English actresses
English female models
English film actresses
English television actresses
English women comedians
People from Hartfield
English people of Swiss descent